Anthophila bidzilyai is a moth in the family Choreutidae. It was described by Yury I. Budashkin in 1997. It is found in Russia.

References

Choreutidae
Moths described in 1997